Saint Augulus (or Augurius, Augustus, Aule, Ouil) was a 3rd or 4th century bishop and martyr in a town called Augusta in Britain, or perhaps in Normandy.
He was possibly Irish in origin.
Little is known about him, but his feast day is given as 7 February.

Monks of Ramsgate account

The monks of St Augustine's Abbey, Ramsgate wrote in their Book of Saints (1921),

Butler's account

The hagiographer Alban Butler (1710–1773) wrote in his Lives of the Fathers, Martyrs, and Other Principal Saints under February 7,

O'Hanlon's views

John O'Hanlon (1821–1905) in his Lives of the Irish Saints discusses "Saint Augulus, Augurius, or Augulius, Bishop of Augusta, in Britain. [Third or Fourth Century]" under February 7.
He notes that no Acts of Augurius exist, although various writers have alluded to him and place his festival at the 7th of February.
He is said to have been of Irish origin and to have presided over Augusta, in Brittany, which may have been the name for London.
Possibly Augusta could have been some other place, such as York.
O'Hanlon continues, 

O'Hanlon discusses other disagreements among the various sources, and concludes,

Notes

Sources

 
 
 

Medieval Irish saints
4th-century deaths